Thomas Laware is a New Hampshire politician.

Education
Laware earned a B.A. from Keene State College.

Military career
Laware served in the United States Air Force in 1971 to 1975 in the Vietnam War.

Political career
Laware served in the New Hampshire House of Representatives where he represented Sullivan 5 district from 2010 to 2012. On November 4, 2014, Laware was elected to the New Hampshire House of Representatives where he represents the Sullivan 8 district. Laware assumed office on December 3, 2014. Laware is a Republican.

Personal life
Laware resides in Charlestown, New Hampshire. Laware is married and has one child. Laware is a member of the following organizations: the National Rifle Association, the American Legion, and the Veterans of Foreign Wars.

References

Living people
Keene State College alumni
People from Charlestown, New Hampshire
Military personnel from New Hampshire
United States Army Air Forces soldiers
Republican Party members of the New Hampshire House of Representatives
21st-century American politicians
Year of birth missing (living people)